Cardellina is a genus of passerine birds in the New World warbler family Parulidae. The genus name Cardellina is a diminutive of the Italian dialect word Cardella for the European goldfinch.

The genus was introduced by the French naturalist Charles Lucien Bonaparte in 1850. The type species was subsequently designated as the red-faced warbler. The genus originally contained one species, the red-faced warbler. A comprehensive study of the wood-warblers published in 2010 that analysed mitochondrial and nuclear DNA sequences found that the five species formed a discrete clade, with the Wilson's and Canada warblers as early offshoots, followed by a lineage that gave rise to two branches - one leading to the red-faced and another that diverged to the red and pink-headed warblers.

List of species 
The following five species are currently recognized.

References 

 
Bird genera
Taxa named by Charles Lucien Bonaparte